Bernard I (c. 1090c. 1158) was the first Lord of Lippe. He reigned from 1123 through 1158.

Lords of Lippe
1090s births
1150s deaths
House of Lippe